Reindeer (any of six species in the genus Rangifer; called caribou in North America) is a deer from Arctic and Subarctic North America and Eurasia; it may refer to:

Reindeer
 Reindeer (genus of deer)
 Finnish forest reindeer
 Siberian forest reindeer
 Siberian tundra reindeer
 Svalbard reindeer
 Peary caribou
 Porcupine caribou
 Dolphin-Union caribou
 Greenland reindeer
 Reindeer distribution
 Reindeer cheese
 Reindeer hunting in Greenland
 Reindeer in Siberian shamanism
 Reindeer in South Georgia
 Sautéed reindeer

Folklore
 Santa Claus's reindeer
 Rudolph the Red-Nosed Reindeer

Military
 HMS Reindeer, ships of the Royal Navy
 USS Reindeer, ships of the US Navy
 Operation Reindeer, 1978 South African military operation in Angola

Places
 Reindeer Island, Lake Winnipeg, Manitoba, Canada
 Reindeer Lake, on the border between Saskatchewan and Manitoba, Canada
 Reindeer Valley, South Georgia

Literature
 Rutland Reindeer, a fictional aircraft in Nevil Shute's 1948 novel, No Highway

Films
 Rutland Reindeer, a fictional aircraft in the 1951 movie No Highway in the Sky
 Reindeer Games, 2000 thriller film, directed by John Frankenheimer

See also
 Caribou (disambiguation)
 Reindeer Island (disambiguation)
 Reindeer Lake (disambiguation)
 Reindeer River (disambiguation)